Hakuyo Maru (Japanese: 白陽丸) was a Japanese transport ship of during World War II.

History
She was laid down on 3 July 1941 at the Kobe shipyard of Mitsubishi Heavy Industries, Ltd. for the benefit of Osaka Merchant Shipping Co., Ltd., Osaka. She was launched on 29 August 1942 and completed on 29 December 1942.

23 October 1944, she left Kataoka Bay Naval Base, Shimushu Island, Kuril Islands for Otaru in convoy WO-303 consisting of transports Hokoku Maru and Umegawa Maru escorted by the destroyer Kamikaze and Etorofu-class escort ship Fukue. The transports are filled with naval personal and fishery workers being removed to the homeland for the winter from the islands of Shimushu and Paramushiro.

She sank quickly in the frigid waters with 1,415 lives lost including 1,312 passengers. Seal evaded depth charge 
attacks by the escorts and the remainder of the convoy reached Otaru safely.

References

1942 ships
Ships built by Mitsubishi Heavy Industries
Maritime incidents in October 1944
Ships sunk by American submarines